Kyle Venter (born March 13, 1991) is an American retired professional soccer player who last played as a defender for the Richmond Kickers in USL League One. Venter is currently an assistant coach for the Florida Gators women's soccer team.

Career

Early career
Venter played college soccer at the University of New Mexico between 2009 and 2013. During his time at college Venter also played for USL PDL club Real Colorado Foxes during their 2012 season.

LA Galaxy
Venter was selected by LA Galaxy in the second round of the 2014 MLS SuperDraft (23rd overall). After signing with the club, Venter was loaned to LA Galaxy II and featured in their win over Orange County Blues FC on March 22, 2014.

Tulsa Roughnecks
Venter signed with USL club Tulsa Roughnecks in March 2015.

Ottawa Fury
On February 11, 2016, Venter signed with Canadian club Ottawa Fury FC.

Penn FC
Venter played with Penn FC in 2018.

FC Tucson
Venter was contracted to FC Tucson in February 2019.

Richmond Kickers
On January 15, 2020, Venter joined USL League One side Richmond Kickers.

Coaching 
Venter spent two seasons working under Tony Amato as an assistant for the Arizona Wildcats before following Amato to the University of Florida.

Honors
MLS Cup: 2014

References

External links 
 
 

1991 births
Living people
Sportspeople from Aurora, Colorado
American soccer players
New Mexico Lobos men's soccer players
Real Colorado Foxes players
LA Galaxy players
LA Galaxy II players
FC Tulsa players
Ottawa Fury FC players
Penn FC players
FC Tucson players
Richmond Kickers players
Association football defenders
Soccer players from Colorado
LA Galaxy draft picks
USL League Two players
USL Championship players
Expatriate soccer players in Canada
USL League One players
Arizona Wildcats women's soccer coaches
Florida Gators women's soccer coaches